Idris Elba is an English actor. He is known for portraying drug trafficker Stringer Bell on the HBO series The Wire, DCI John Luther on the BBC One series Luther and Nelson Mandela in the biographical film Mandela: Long Walk to Freedom (2013). He has been nominated four times for a Golden Globe Award for Best Actor – Miniseries or Television Film, winning one and was nominated five times for a Primetime Emmy Award.

Film

Television

Video games

Music videos

References

External links
 
 

British filmographies
Male actor filmographies